Atça is a town in the district of Sultanhisar in Turkey's Aydın Province. The plan of the town comes from Paris's Place de l'Étoile.

History 
After the Greek invasion, the town was destroyed by fire and was rebuilt as a circular town.

Town twinning
 Makó, Hungary (since May 2008)

External links 

 atca09.com  
 Municipality of Atça - Official web site

See also 
 Atçalı Kel Mehmet Efe

References 

Towns in Turkey
Populated places in Aydın Province
Sultanhisar District
Planned cities in Turkey